Manuel Miguel Afonso Pedroso Liz Rodrigues (born 30 November 1989), is a Portuguese professional footballer who plays for Sintrense as a second striker.

Career
Born in Lisbon, Liz is a youth graduate from S.C.U. Torreense, joining them in 1999 and staying there for nine seasons, debuting for the first team on 24 August 2008 in the third tier.

After two seasons, he joined Sport União Sintrense in the fourth tier, racking up more than sixty league games in two seasons, sparking the interest of S.L. Benfica which signed him and teammate Nélson Semedo on 12 January 2012.

His first season was spent at C.D. Fátima, signing a loan deal on 9 August 2012. When he started the second season, he was not registered with the reserve side, spending six months without competing, until he joined Atlético CP on a three and a half years contract on 26 January 2014.

On 23 January 2014, Liz made his professional debut with Atlético in a Segunda Liga match against Portimonense. He left Atlético at the end of the season and returned to Sintrense.

References

External links
 
 

1989 births
Living people
Footballers from Lisbon
Portuguese footballers
Association football forwards
S.L. Benfica footballers
Liga Portugal 2 players
S.C.U. Torreense players
Atlético Clube de Portugal players
C.D. Fátima players
S.U. Sintrense players
S.U. 1º Dezembro players